The 2012 season for  began in January at the Tour Down Under. As a UCI ProTeam, the team were automatically invited and obligated to send a squad to every event in the UCI World Tour.

After a season at Professional Continental level in 2011, FDJ were promoted back to the top tier for the 2012 season, taking one of the two vacant licences that had been made available following the conclusion of the 2011 season. Also prior to the season, French building merchants BigMat joined the team as co-sponsors, contributing €2 million to the team.

2012 roster
Ages as of 1 January 2012.

Riders who joined the team for the 2012 season

Riders who left the team during or after the 2011 season

Season victories

Yauheni Hutarovich won the National Road Race Championship of Belarus, and Nacer Bouhanni won the French National Road Race Championships on 24 June.

Footnotes

References

2012 road cycling season by team
Groupama–FDJ
2012 in French sport